Emely Pichardo (born 2003) is an American-born Dominican footballer who plays as a defensive midfielder for high school team Muhlenberg Muhls, the FC Revolution under–18 team and the Dominican Republic women's national team.

Early life
Pichardo hails from Berks County, Pennsylvania.

High school career
Pichardo has attended the Muhlenberg High School in Laureldale, Pennsylvania.

International career
Pichardo made her senior debut for the Dominican Republic on 18 February 2021 in a friendly home match against Puerto Rico.

References

External links

2003 births
Living people
Citizens of the Dominican Republic through descent
Dominican Republic women's footballers
Women's association football midfielders
Dominican Republic women's international footballers
People from Berks County, Pennsylvania
Sportspeople from the Delaware Valley
Soccer players from Pennsylvania
American women's soccer players
American sportspeople of Dominican Republic descent
African-American women's soccer players
21st-century African-American sportspeople
21st-century African-American women